Pearl Charles (born May 11, 1991) is an American singer-songwriter from Los Angeles, California. Her sound is a melding of 1960s rock and 1970s cosmic country.

Education
Pearl Charles earned a BFA in music from CalArts.

Music
Pearl Charles got her start as a musician at age 18 in a country duo called the Driftwood Singers, with Christian Lee Hutson. She then went on to join a garage rock band called the Blank Tapes as drummer.

Charles began a solo project in 2012, and released her first solo record, a 2015 self-titled EP on Burger Records.

According to Billboard, Charles is a genre-blending artist in the style of Lana Del Rey and Jenny Lewis, with "subdued vocals and more uptempo, playful production".

Kanine Records released her full-length debut album, titled Sleepless Dreamer, in 2018.

Personal life
Pearl is the daughter of Larry Charles.

Discography
Studio albums
 Sleepless Dreamer (2018)
 Magic Mirror (2021)

'Singles and EPs
 Pearl Charles (2015)
 Night Tides (2017)
 Sleepless Dreamer (2018)
 All the Boys'' (2018)

References

External links
 
 
 

1991 births
Living people
California Institute of the Arts alumni
American women singer-songwriters
American women rock singers
21st-century American women singers
Musical groups from Los Angeles
Rock music groups from California
Folk rock groups from California
21st-century American singers
Guitarists from California
21st-century American guitarists
21st-century American women guitarists
Kanine Records artists
Singer-songwriters from California